KLCY (105.5 FM) is a Country formatted radio station licensed to serve Vernal, Utah.  The station is owned by Ashley Communications, Inc.  It airs a country music format. The station is involved in a number of charitable and community projects.

Translators

References

External links
KLCY official website

LCY
Country radio stations in the United States
Radio stations established in 1980